The Incredible Voyage is Tristan Jones' account of his voyage from the lowest body of water on earth (The Dead Sea) to the highest (Lake Titicaca).  It spans several years.  Jones' voyage happened using two different boats: first was the "Barbara" and the second was the "Sea Dart". The Barbara was not permitted to be launched on the Dead Sea. Jones' books are a combination of fact and fiction.

British books
Travel autobiographies
British travel books
English non-fiction books